Palash Jyoti Das (born 23  December 1984) is an Indian cricketer who plays for Assam cricket team. He is a right-handed top-order batsman who bowled right-arm offbreak.

Palash Jyoti Das made his first-class appearance in the 2001/02 Ranji Trophy. He represented India Under-15 Team in the year 1999/2000 in Asia Cup. Again in England, represented India Under-15 Team in U/15 World Cup in the year .

References

External links
 

Living people
Indian cricketers
Assam cricketers
Cricketers from Guwahati
1984 births